Midori Tanaka is a Japanese athlete.  She won a gold medal in the individual 200 metres and a silver medal in the  relay in the 1954 Asian Games.

References

Athletes (track and field) at the 1954 Asian Games
Japanese female sprinters
Asian Games gold medalists for Japan
Asian Games silver medalists for Japan
Asian Games medalists in athletics (track and field)
Medalists at the 1954 Asian Games
Possibly living people
Year of birth missing